Computational microscopy is a subfield of computational imaging, which combines algorithmic reconstruction with sensing to capture microscopic images of objects. The algorithms used in computational microscopy often combine the information of several images captured using various illuminations or measurements to form an aggregated 2D or 3D image using iterative techniques or machine learning. Notable forms of computational microscopy include super-resolution fluorescence microscopy, quantitative phase imaging, and Fourier ptychography. Computational microscopy is at the intersection of computer science and optics.

References 

Imaging
Microscopy
Multidimensional signal processing